St Oran's Chapel (Odhráin/Orain/Odran) is a medieval chapel located on the island of Iona in the Inner Hebrides off the west coast of Scotland. Built in the 12th century, the chapel was dedicated to St Oran. St Oran's Chapel was a ruin until the chapel was restored during the same time as Iona Abbey.  The chapel is protected as a part of the Iona monastic settlement scheduled monument.

Burial ground
The burial ground surrounding the chapel is known as Reilig Òdhrain.

Notes

External links

Listed churches in Scotland
Churches in Argyll and Bute
Iona
12th-century establishments in Scotland
12th-century church buildings in Scotland